{{DISPLAYTITLE:C18H22O2}}
The molecular formula C18H22O2 may refer to:

 17α-Dihydroequilin
 17β-Dihydroequilin
 8,9-Dehydroestradiol
 Dienedione
 Estrone, a hormone
 Hexestrol, an estrogen
 Trenbolone, a veterinary steroid drug